Eyes to the Sun is the first studio album by alternative rock band Sparks the Rescue. It was originally released on October 7, 2008 under the Double Blind Music record label. The album was re-released by Fearless Records on May 5, 2009, and featured new songs, a different track listing, and had all previous tracks remixed and remastered.

Track listing
"My Heart Radio" – 2:32
"I Swear That She's the One" – 3:29
"Autumn" – 3:26
"Shipwreck" – 3:16
"Hello Mexico" – 3:56
"Skeleton" – 3:33
"The Gravity" – 3:45
"Chemistry Set" – 3:14
"Saco Boys Have No Class" – 3:27
"We May Be Cruel" – 3:32
"Pangaea" – 3:57

Re-release
On May 5, 2009, Fearless Records re-released Eyes to the Sun, featuring new songs and a different track listing and album cover. The previous tracks were remixed and remastered. The digital release features four bonus tracks and a download of the music video for "Autumn".

Track listing

iTunes bonus tracks

Personnel
Alex Roy – lead vocals, Guitar
Patrick O'Connell – guitar, backing vocals
Toby McAllister – guitar, backing vocals
Ben Briggs – bass
Nate Spencer – drums

References

2008 debut albums
Sparks the Rescue albums
Fearless Records albums